Elaine Williams (December 28, 1932 - December 23, 1963) was an American lesbian pulp fiction author and editor of the late 1950s and early 1960s. She wrote under a pseudonym, largely either as Sloan Britton or Sloane Britain.

Personal life 
Elaine Williams was born as Elaine H. Cumming in Richmond Hill, Queens, New York on December 28, 1932. Her father was Alexander Cumming and her mother was Edna Louise Westpfal or Westphall Cumming. Fellow pulp author Gilbert Fox said of Williams: "Her family refused to accept the fact that she was a lesbian".

Williams married Ernest E Williams in 1950 and thus changed her name to Elaine Cumming Williams. Together, they had four children and lived in Red Hook, Brooklyn, New York.

Career 

Williams became one of the first editors at Midwood Books in 1959. Along with editing for Midwood, Williams was asked to author her own lesbian pulp books.

At the same time, Williams began writing her own paperback lesbian pulps under a collection of pseudonyms following a similar pattern: Sloan Britain, Sloane Britain, Sloane Britton, Sloan Britton, and possibly other variations. She published her first two novels in 1959: First Person-Third Sex and The Needle. These books were published by Newsstand Library and Beacon, respectively. Both books contained lesbian or bisexual themes, thus placing Williams' work in the canon of lesbian pulp fiction of the 50s and 60s. Further, Williams' early work contained positive portrayals of lesbian relationships, making her one of the pro-lesbian pulp authors. Literary scholar Yvonne Keller named Williams as one of a small group of writers whose work formed the subgenre of "pro-lesbian" pulp fiction; others include Ann Bannon, Paula Christian, Joan Ellis, March Hastings, Marjorie Lee, Della Martin, Rea Michaels, Claire Morgan, Vin Packer, Randy Salem, Artemis Smith, Valerie Taylor, Tereska Torres, and Shirley Verel.

Her 1961 novel These Curious Pleasures revolves around a main character named Sloane Britain. It is thought that the plot is somewhat autobiographical of Williams, or at least depicts a lesbian relationship which Williams dreamed of. Also in this book is a character named Harry “Happy” Broadman, who is curiously similar to Midwood Books co-founder and publisher Harry Shorten. Both in real life and fiction, Shorten has been said to have been an unpredictable and at times aggressive man. Williams' inclusion of this character might clue readers into what it was like as one of the first editors and writers at Midwood.

Williams published eight other lesbian pulp novels in her career, plus two posthumous short novels published as Midwood Doubles. She was and still is praised for her realistic and sympathetic portrayals of lesbian and bisexual characters, but her later novels are notably more cynical, with dismal endings.

Death 
Williams died just six days before her 31st birthday, December 23, 1963. She and her husband had been driving home from a workplace holiday party for the hotel at which her husband was a chef. Newspaper reports from the time disagree on who was driving; around 3:00 AM and a block from home the car skidded on snow and hit a tree head-on, killing Williams and gravely injuring her husband.

She is buried in Barrytown, New York.

Works 
 First Person-Third Sex, 1959
 The Needle, 1959
 Meet Marilyn, 1960
 Unnatural, 1960
 Insatiable, 1960
 These Curious Pleasures, 1961
 That Other Hunger, 1961
 Woman Doctor, 1962
 Ladder of Flesh, 1962
 The Delicate Vice, 1963
 Finders Keepers, 1965
 Summer of Sin
 Peep Booth

References

External links 

 Sally Taft Duplaix Collection at the Mortimer Rare Book Collection, Smith College Special Collections

American lesbian writers
Writers from Queens, New York
1932 births
1963 deaths
American editors
Pulp fiction writers
Burials in New York (state)
20th-century American LGBT people
20th-century American novelists
20th-century American women writers
American women novelists
American LGBT novelists